Jess Gillam  (born 24 May 1998) is a British saxophonist and BBC radio broadcaster from Ulverston, Cumbria. Gillam hosts This Classical Life on BBC Radio 3.

Education 
Gillam attended the Junior Royal Northern College of Music while at secondary school. She left sixth form early to concentrate on practising the saxophone and then attended the Royal Northern College of Music in Manchester but dropped out before completing her undergraduate course. During the coronavirus pandemic in 2020 she completed a Master's degree from Guildhall School of Music and Drama in London.

Recognition 
Gillam is the youngest ever presenter on BBC Radio 3 and the first saxophonist to be signed to Decca Classics Her debut album RISE reached No.1 in the UK Classical chart.

She was appointed Member of the Order of the British Empire (MBE) in the 2021 Birthday Honours for services to music.

Albums 
 RISE (2019)
CHRISTMAS (2019)
 TIME (2020)

Virtual Scratch Orchestra 
During the COVID-19 pandemic, Gillam offered her fans the opportunity to participate in several virtual orchestras. This involved participants submitting videos of themselves performing individual parts on their chosen instrument. These were then edited, mixed and published on YouTube. The orchestras attracted participation of well over 500 entries on each occasion, and included the songs "Where Are We Now?", "Let It Be" and "Sleigh Ride".

Awards 

 Classic BRIT Award in Sound of Classical 2018 
 Awards for Young Musicians (AYM) Award

Notable performances 
 BBC Young Musician of the Year, 2016
 Last Night of the Proms, 2018

References

External links
This Classical Life (BBC Radio 3)
Jess Gillam website

1998 births
Living people
British saxophonists
Women saxophonists
Classical music radio presenters
21st-century saxophonists
Members of the Order of the British Empire
21st-century British women musicians
 People from Cumbria
 BBC Radio 3 presenters